Acheson is a surname of Anglo-Scots origin with Norman antecedents. It derives from the pet name Atkin, which is a diminutive of Adam.

In Scotland the name is more usually rendered as Acheson, while it is more usually found rendered as Atkinson in England, where it is particularly common in the north. In Ireland the name is common only in Ulster and particularly in counties Antrim and Down. A different spelling emerged in Canada, as Atcheson. Some Atkinsons are descended from Planters, although the name was recorded in Ireland before that period.

Acheson is a variation of the name in Scotland and the Border region, having been originally spelled Atzinson (with the 'z' being pronounced as 'y', as in yet).

People 
 Archibald Acheson, 1st Viscount Gosford (1718–1790), Irish peer and politician
 Archibald Acheson, 2nd Earl of Gosford (1776–1849), British politician
 Sir Arthur Acheson, 5th Baronet (1688–1748), Irish politician and baronet
 Carrie Acheson (1934–2023), Irish politician
 David John Acheson (born 1946), British applied mathematician 
 Dean Acheson (1893–1971), American statesman and lawyer
 Sir Donald Acheson (1926–2010), British physician
 Edward Goodrich Acheson (1856–1931), American chemist and inventor
 Ernest F. Acheson (1855–1917), American politician and newspaper editor
 Frank Oswald Victor Acheson (1887–1948), New Zealand land court judge
 James Acheson (born 1946), British costume designer
 John Acheson (miner) (fl. 1560-1581), Scottish goldsmith and mint official
 John Acheson (actor) (died 1998), British actor
 Kenny Acheson (born 1957), British Formula One driver
 Marcus W. Acheson (1828–1906), American judge
 Sir Nicholas Acheson, 4th Baronet (c. 1655–1701), Irish baronet and politician
 Earl of Gosford, a title held by the Acheson family

References 

English-language surnames